Sveti Duh is a village in the Municipality of Škofja Loka in the Upper Carniola region of Slovenia.

Church

The church in the centre of the village is dedicated to the Holy Spirit. It is Gothic in its origins with the original sanctuary surviving, but was largely rebuilt in 1856. Some 15th-century frescos survive in the sanctuary and the belfry is from the 17th century. The high altar is from 1667, but was extensively renovated and repainted in 1860, when the two side altars were also made.

References

External links

Sveti Duh at Geopedia

Populated places in the Municipality of Škofja Loka